Carli Bay is a Bay located in the urban town Couva in Central Trinidad. It is a popular fishing location in the Gulf of Paria off the coast of West Trinidad.

Bays of Trinidad and Tobago
Beaches of Trinidad and Tobago
Couva